Johnny Shannon (born 29 July 1932) is an English actor who appeared in numerous television and film productions over a 40-year period, often playing policemen or crooks in crime dramas.

Shannon's most memorable roles include the crime lord Harry Flowers in the cult film Performance (1970), Jack in That'll Be the Day (1973), the Agent in Slade In Flame (1975), the caged music executive in The Great Rock 'n' Roll Swindle (1980), Peter Rachman in Scandal (1989), and as a landlord in Stoned (2005).

He played "Roly-Poly Peter" in the Minder episode Second Hand Pose. Other television appearances include; EastEnders, Z-Cars, Beryl's Lot, Fawlty Towers, The Sweeney, The Bill and as London Gangster Charlie Turkel in The Professionals episode Old Dog with New Tricks.

Shannon's other interests include watching horse racing and boxing.

Filmography

References

External links

1932 births
English male film actors
English male television actors
Living people
People from Lambeth
Male actors from London